Crucifix (1837–1857) was an undefeated, Classic Race winning, British-bred Thoroughbred racemare.  She was also the dam of three sires who had a great influence on the breed.

Breeding
Crucifix was a bay filly foaled in 1837, by The Derby winner, Priam; her dam was the then 21-year-old, Octaviana by Octavian. Her breeder was George Stanhope, 6th Earl of Chesterfield. Crucifix was a sister to Chesterfield, who sired the stakes-winner, The Hero. Her sire, Priam, also sired The Oaks winners Miss Letty and Industry before he was sold for 3,500 guineas and exported in 1837 to Virginia in the United States.

The powerful racing figure, Lord George Bentinck, bought Crucifix as a foal at foot with her 22-year-old dam for 65 guineas. At maturity, Crucifix stood nearly 16 hands high, with her body being described as "wiry", and she possessed a temperamental disposition.

Racing record

At two years: 1839
Crucifix had nine starts for wins in the Chesterfield Stakes (carrying top weight), Lavant Stakes, July Stakes and Molecombe Stakes, the Hopeful Stakes at Newmarket, the Clearwell Stakes, the Prendergast Stakes, and a walk-over in a sweepstakes at Newmarket; in the ninth race, the Criterion Stakes she dead-heated with Gibraltar. Her prize money for that season was a record £4,587.

At three years: 1840
In her three starts as a three-year-old, Crucifix won the Two Thousand Guineas, One Thousand Guineas and Epsom Oaks. The false starts resorted to at the start of the Oaks lasted about an hour, and it took about 15 attempts to get the 15 runners started. As a result of these tactics to defeat favourites, Lord George introduced reforms to inhibit this practice. Welfare ran second to Crucifix and she, too, was by Priam.  After the running of the Oaks, Crucifix pulled up lame, and was retired with earnings of £10,287.

Crucifix became the shortest odds winner of the 1,000 Guineas when she was 1/10 odds on. She was also the first of only four horses to ever win both the 1,000 Guineas and the 2,000 Guineas in the same year, when the two races were run two days apart. In her dead-heat in the Criterion Stakes at Newmarket Racecourse and her win in the Oaks Stakes at Epsom, Crucifix defeated the good mare Pocahontas and others on each occasion.

Stud record
Crucifix was the dam of:  
 1842 colt, Cowl by Bay Middleton, sire
 1844 b colt, Crozier by Lancercost 
 1845 b colt, Surplice by Touchstone, won Epsom Derby and St. Leger Stakes, sire of Florin, (won Poule d'Essai des Poulains) and others, and broodmare sire of Queen Bertha
 1846 Cucullus by Bay Middleton, died
 1847 colt, Pontifex by Touchstone  
 1849 filly, Rosary by Touchstone 
 1850 b colt, Constantine, by Cotherstone 
 1851 b colt, Cardinal, by Touchstone 
 1852 filly, Chalice by Orlando, won Royal Hunt Cup, second dam of Placida (Epsom Oaks)

In order to pursue his political career Lord Bentinck sold his entire racing interests, including at least 60 horses along with Crucifix and her son, and future Epsom Derby winner, Surplice, for £10,000 to Edward Lloyd-Mostyn, 2nd Baron Mostyn.  Crucifix was later sold to Henry Agar-Ellis, 3rd Viscount Clifden.

Ajax, the undefeated French Derby winner and sire, great broodmare Double Life (dam of Precipitation and Persian Gulf), and many other good horses descend from Crucifix in the distaff line. Crucifix also became the 12th dam of another great race-mare, Meld who won the British Fillies Triple Crown. Crucifix is the taproot mare of Family 2-i.

Crucifix died in 1857 and was buried beside Bay Middleton at the Days' stables, Danebury, near Stockbridge, Hampshire.

Pedigree

See also
List of leading Thoroughbred racehorses
Triple Crown of Thoroughbred Racing

References

1837 racehorse births
1857 racehorse deaths
Racehorses trained in the United Kingdom
Racehorses bred in the United Kingdom
Undefeated racehorses
Thoroughbred family 2-c
Thoroughbred family 2-i
2000 Guineas winners
1000 Guineas winners
Epsom Oaks winners